The 2015 Food City 500 In Support Of Steve Byrnes And Stand Up To Cancer was a NASCAR Sprint Cup Series race held on April 19, 2015, at Bristol Motor Speedway in Bristol, Tennessee. Contested over 511 laps—extended from 500 laps due to a green–white–checker finish—on the  concrete short track, it was the eighth race of the 2015 NASCAR Sprint Cup Series season. Matt Kenseth won the race – his first victory since 2013 – while Jimmie Johnson and Jeff Gordon finished second and third. Ricky Stenhouse Jr. and Ryan Newman rounded out the top five.

Kenseth won the pole for the race and led 47 laps. Kevin Harvick led a race high 184 laps before getting caught in a late race wreck and finished outside the top ten for the first time in 2015. The race had 21 lead changes among six different drivers, as well as eleven caution flag periods for 117 laps. The race was also stopped three times, for a total duration of 4 hours and 36 minutes for rain.

Kenseth's victory – his 32nd in Sprint Cup – ended a 51-race winless streak commencing after his victory at the 2013 Sylvania 300. It was his fourth win at Bristol and the eighth at the track for Joe Gibbs Racing. The win moved Kenseth up to eighth in the points standings. Despite the win, Toyota still trailed Chevrolet by 46–points in the manufacturer standings.

The race was carried by Fox Sports on the broadcast Fox network for the American television audience, while the radio broadcast was carried by the Performance Racing Network and Sirius XM NASCAR Radio.

Report

Background

Bristol Motor Speedway, formerly known as Bristol International Raceway and Bristol Raceway, is a NASCAR short track venue located in Bristol, Tennessee. Constructed in 1960, it held its first NASCAR race on July 30, 1961. Despite its short length, Bristol is among the most popular tracks on the NASCAR schedule because of its distinct features, which include extraordinarily steep banking, an all concrete surface, two pit roads, and stadium-like seating.

Kevin Harvick entered Bristol with a 26-point lead over Joey Logano, with Martin Truex Jr. a further 14 points in arrears in third place. Brad Keselowski entered 60 back in fourth place, while Kasey Kahne completed the top five in the championship standings, 76 behind Harvick.

Changes to the track
In the wake of Kyle Busch's double leg-breaking crash in February's Alert Today Florida 300 at Daytona International Speedway, Bristol Motor Speedway announced on April 3 that SAFER barriers had been installed along the entire circumference of the outer wall. Previously, the track had barriers only in the turns. Track general manager Jerry Caldwell stated that "the safety of our fans and competitors continues to be a focal point for Bristol Motor Speedway" and that the circuit was "able to secure an additional 600 feet of SAFER barriers and will complete the build out of the front and backstretch outside walls before the Food City 500 race weekend".

Name change
On April 10, Bristol Motor Speedway announced that the Food City 500 would be renamed the Food City 500 In Support of Steve Byrnes and Stand Up to Cancer. This change was made to honor longtime NASCAR broadcaster Steve Byrnes who was battling head and neck cancer. "We stand with the NASCAR community in being Steve Byrnes Strong," said President and CEO of Food City, Steve Smith. "By banding together, we can drive even more awareness and support for our friend Steve, his family and everyone who Stands Up to Cancer." Byrnes died two days after the race.

Entry list
The entry list for the Food City 500 was released on Monday, April 13, 2015, at 11:21 a.m. Eastern time. Forty-five cars were entered for the race. The only new entry that was not entered for the previous week's race at Texas Motor Speedway was Ron Hornaday Jr. in the No. 30 Chevrolet by The Motorsports Group.

First practice

Qualifying

"I got it all that first lap," Kenseth said. "Good job. That was about as good as we were going to get...it was the best we could do with what we got. It was our best lap of the day". Brad Keselowski stated that it was "still very, very early in the weekend and the track is really not indicative of what we're gonna have to race", but joined Kenseth on the front row, 0.022 seconds behind in second place; but Keselowski was looking forward to "a great spot on pit road to help us all day on Sunday". Despite missing out on the top-12 pole shootout in 13th place, Dale Earnhardt Jr. advised that he and his team "will be very good this weekend" and all they had to do was "to improve how the car drives". With 45 entrants, Brendan Gaughan and Ron Hornaday Jr. failed to qualify for the race.

Qualifying results

Practice (post-qualifying)

Second practice

During the session, Tony Stewart tagged the wall with the right-rear corner of his car. The damage was minor and he returned to the track to finish the session. Towards the end of the session, Ricky Stenhouse Jr. made contact with Carl Edwards. The damage was also minor and both cars returned to the session.

Final practice

Race

First-half

Start

The race was scheduled to start at 1:13 p.m., but inclement weather delayed the start for over an hour. The track was eventually dried up enough to allow the race to commence at 2:31 p.m.. Matt Kenseth led the first five laps before losing the lead to Kevin Harvick on lap 6. Ricky Stenhouse Jr. made contact with the wall exiting turn 2. He saved the car and the race continued under green. The first caution of the race flew on lap 19 when Brad Keselowski and teammate Joey Logano hit the front stretch wall. Exiting turn 4, Keselowski's car got loose trying to pass Alex Kennedy, tapped the wall and turned down towards the apron. Logano was right behind him and was unable to avoid hitting his teammate. Keselowski put the crash down to the weather, saying that "it was a really light sprinkle, the track was barely dry" and "that the car just took off on me", while also stating that he was disappointed to make contact with teammate Logano after his car "moved crazy sideways". Logano stated that the crash "happened quick, obviously" and that "you get early in this race and kind of want to settle in and just starting to get the top worked in a little bit there and Brad just got loose underneath that lapped car". To add insult to injury for the Penske duo, the rain returned just moments later that red-flagged the race on lap 22.

Driver change

Prior to the restart, Erik Jones made his unofficial debut in the Sprint Cup Series when he replaced Denny Hamlin – who had suffered a muscle spasm – in the No. 11 car. During the race telecast, Hamlin stated that the injury had occurred during the race; he had "just pulled something in my neck to upper back about lap 12" and that he had "stretched it out and we've been working on it the last few hours". By stepping out the car, Hamlin also explained that "it's just better to have Erik come here and run some laps, get used to these Cup cars. We know where he is going to be in a few years". Jones, who had competed in the Xfinity Series race the previous day, had already flown back to Charlotte, North Carolina when he received a text message from an unnamed crew member of the No. 11 car to be prepared to fly back down to Bristol. "I got a text from one of the crew members and they let me know that I might need to be on standby," Jones said. "Right then I started packing a bag. I called my dad and said, 'Hey, I think I might be getting to run a Cup race tonight.' He was like, 'Okay, cool keep me updated.' Took off right from there and flew here and helicoptered in and got in and drove." He arrived by helicopter at the track just five minutes before the race restarted. Jones piloted the car to a 26th-place finish, which was credited to Hamlin as he had started the race.

Restart

While the race was still under its first caution, the scoring pylon and digital leaderboards all changed the positions to 24 on the 24th lap in honor of Jeff Gordon. The race restarted shortly after 7:00 p.m. on lap 35 with Kevin Harvick in the lead. The race proceeded orderly until the second caution of the race flew on lap 61 – a scheduled competition caution because of the rain. Kurt Busch took the lead from his teammate Harvick, when Harvick pitted on the backstretch. Greg Biffle opted not to pit and assumed the lead, while Brett Moffitt and David Ragan had to start from the rear of the field, after both were caught speeding on pit road.

Green flag run

The race restarted on lap 69. While Greg Biffle got a jump on the restart – on old tires – Kurt Busch on four new tires took the lead on lap 70 and would hold the lead for the next 55 laps. Kevin Harvick was tapped exiting turn 2 by Michael McDowell and made light contact with the wall, causing cosmetic damage. Dale Earnhardt Jr. made an unscheduled stop on lap 103 for a flat tire. Landon Cassill brushed the wall and began to slow down on the backstretch and almost took out several cars on lap 108. Kevin Harvick took the lead on lap 126 and held it for the next portion of the race before Busch took back the lead on lap 162. Harvick regained the lead on lap 167, before the race's third caution period commenced the following lap due to weepers. With the drivers pitting on either side of the track, the lead swapped hands momentarily; however, Harvick held the lead for the restart on lap 176.

Jeff Gordon made an unscheduled stop on lap 205 for a loose, deflating wheel; he lost two laps in the process. In a show of support for Steve Byrnes, the fans and crews all stood up on the 250th lap holding up signs reading "I Stand Up For Steve." The Fox crew went silent for the next three laps to show their support for their ill cohort. Jeff Gordon, on much fresher tires, managed to pull up to and pass leader Harvick to earn back one of his laps. This allowed Carl Edwards to pass Harvick for the lead on lap 257. Edwards put him back down two laps before the caution flew for the fourth time on lap 266 for rain. Edwards and Busch swapped the lead on pit road, but Edwards exited pit road with the lead. David Gilliland and Ryan Newman both started at the rear of the field for the restart; they were caught speeding on pit road. The rain intensified and the race was red flagged for the second time on lap 273.

Second-half

Halfway

After a 16-minute delay, the race restarted on lap 278; no sooner had the race restarted before an incident in turn 4 brought out the fifth caution. Going into turn 3, Kurt Busch pushed up into Jimmie Johnson on his outside; Johnson made moderate contact with the wall, while Busch spun out in front of the oncoming field. Other than a few pushed in fenders and Alex Bowman spinning out behind Busch, there was no major damage.

Trouble in turn 1

The race restarted on lap 292. Martin Truex Jr. cut down his left-front tire after making contact with Mike Bliss exiting turn 2. The sixth caution of the race flew on lap 310 for a multi-car wreck in turn 1. Jeb Burton got turned into the wall by Johnson. David Ragan crashed into the back of Johnson and then T-boned the side of Burton's car, while Johnson slid down the track. Kevin Harvick, who was running third in the race at the time, could not stop in time, got sideways and crashed into Ragan. Ragan described the incident as "when you race back there with the squirrels, you find a nut sometimes" but that was "just Bristol" and "one of those things you have in short track racing". Kurt Busch was penalized for an uncontrolled tire and restarted from the tail-end of the field.

Restart
The race restarted on lap 325. A piece of metal that had fallen off Danica Patrick's car in turn 1 brought out the seventh caution of the race on lap 344. Edwards swapped the lead with teammate Matt Kenseth on pit road, but Kyle Larson opted not to pit and assumed the lead. The race restarted on lap 350. The eighth caution of the race flew on lap 367 for a heavy crash involving Cassill. Trying to get around him on the front stretch, Larson moved up and clipped Cassill's car. He clipped J. J. Yeley, who in turn, crashed into the turn 1 wall. He got out of the car unaided.

Fourth quarter

The race restarted on lap 381. Matt Kenseth caught up to Kyle Larson and the two battled for the lead for a good ten laps before Larson began to pull away with 81 laps to go. He hit pit road with 64 laps to go and Kenseth took back the lead. Kurt Busch went to the bottom of Kenseth, and used Martin Truex. Jr. as a pick to take the lead with 56 laps to go. After being down two laps at one point during the race, Jeff Gordon muscled his way into third with 50 laps to go. The ninth caution of the race flew with 29 laps to go for a multi-car wreck in turn 4. In a classic Bristol accordion effect, it started when Jamie McMurray blew a right-front tire running next to the wall in turn 3. Josh Wise, who was running right behind him, rear-ended him and was in turn, rear-ended by Clint Bowyer. Ricky Stenhouse Jr. was slowing down to avoid the wreck ahead when he was hit in the rear by Erik Jones, before Michael Annett rear-ended Jones. Danica Patrick, who was also trying to avoid the wreck, got hit in the rear and turned by Michael McDowell. Bowyer sprained his wrist trying to avoid hitting Wise again. Busch was the only driver to pit under the caution, and Kenseth assumed the lead.

The race restarted with 19 laps to go, but the 10th caution of the race flew the following lap for a multi-car wreck on the backstretch. Tony Stewart clipped Kasey Kahne who turned down into A. J. Allmendinger. Both drivers hit the inside wall before turning back onto the racing surface taking out Casey Mears and Truex Jr. in the process. The race restarted with eight laps to go, before the 11th caution of the race flew with six laps to go for another multi-car wreck on the backstretch. In another classic Bristol accordion effect, Edwards got loose exiting turn 2 and made contact with the wall. Kurt Busch had no time to react and crashed into him. Justin Allgaier clipped and turned with Paul Menard trying to avoid Edwards' car. Sam Hornish Jr. got turned by Matt DiBenedetto while trying to avoid the wreck. After several laps under yellow – taking the race beyond its scheduled 500-lap distance – the race was red flagged for the third time on lap 505 as rain returned to the track again. The top three cars were borderline on fuel with the fuel window being 130 laps and their last stop being over 20 laps more than the window. The cars were brought down pit road after the race was suspended. After an additional 20-minute delay, the field began rolling off pit road. After three laps, the race restarted and pole-sitter Matt Kenseth took the victory on a green–white–checker finish, his first victory in 51 races going back to 2013.

Post-race

Driver comments
In Victory Lane, Kenseth was pleased at ending his 18-month streak, stating that he was "glad we were able to finish this tonight and we had the car to stay ahead at the end", while also stating that "it was a crazy night for sure but it feels good to be back here in Victory Lane". In second place was Jimmie Johnson, who described the race as "a wild night", but praised his team for all their hard work and was "thrilled to get such a great finish here at really one of the tougher tracks for me as a driver".

Race results

Race statistics
21 lead changes among 6 different drivers
11 cautions for 117 laps; 3 red flags for 4 hours and 36 minutes
Time of race: 3 hours, 37 minutes, 54 seconds
Average speed: 
Matt Kenseth took home $217,961 in winnings

Race awards
 Coors Light Pole Award: Matt Kenseth (14.917)
 3M Lap Leader: Kevin Harvick (184 laps)
 American Ethanol Green Flag Restart Award: Matt Kenseth (15.753)
 Duralast Brakes "Bake In The Race" Award: Kevin Harvick
 Freescale "Wide Open": Ricky Stenhouse Jr.
 Ingersoll Rand Power Move: Kyle Larson, 11 positions
 MAHLE Clevite Engine Builder of the Race: Toyota Racing Development, #20
 Mobil 1 Driver of the Race: Matt Kenseth (129.8 driver rating)
 Moog Steering and Suspension Problem Solver of The Race: Ricky Stenhouse Jr. (crew chief Nick Sandler (0.238 seconds))
 NASCAR Sprint Cup Leader Bonus: No winner: rolls over to $50,000 at next event
 Sherwin-Williams Fastest Lap: Matt Kenseth (Lap 385, 15.028)
 Sunoco Rookie of The Race: Brett Moffitt

Media

Television
Fox Sports covered their 15th race at Bristol Motor Speedway. Mike Joy, Larry McReynolds and Darrell Waltrip, the all-time wins leader at Bristol Motor Speedway with twelve victories, had the call in the booth for the race. Jamie Little, Chris Neville, Vince Welch and Matt Yocum handled the pit road duties.

Radio
PRN had the radio call for the race, which was simulcasted on Sirius XM NASCAR Radio. Doug Rice, Mark Garrow and Wendy Venturini called the race in the booth when the field was racing down the front stretch. Rob Albright called the race from atop the suites in turn 3 when the field was racing down the backstretch. Brad Gillie, Brett McMillan, Jim Noble and Steve Richards worked pit road for PRN.

Standings after the race

Drivers' championship standings

Manufacturers' championship standings

Note: Only the first sixteen positions are included for the driver standings.

Notes

References

External links

 Official website of Bristol Motor Speedway

Food City 500
Food City 500
NASCAR races at Bristol Motor Speedway